Chakrapani Shukla (2 April 1916 – 1992) was an Indian politician. He was a Member of Parliament, representing Madhya  Pradesh in the Rajya Sabha the upper house of India's Parliament as a member of the Indian National Congress.

Shukla died in 1992.

References

1916 births
1992 deaths
Indian National Congress politicians from Madhya Pradesh
Rajya Sabha members from Madhya  Pradesh